Cordova University FC (formerly known as PS Sumbawa Barat) is an Indonesian football club based in West Sumbawa, West Nusa Tenggara. Currently the club is playing in the Liga 3.

History

In 2011 the club successfully promoted from Liga Indonesia First Division to Liga Indonesia Premier Division. They get third place on the 2011–12 Liga Indonesia Premier Division (LI) first round and then advanced to the second round. Saddam Husain, a native of West Sumbawa who ranks among the top three goal scorers in the 2011–12 Liga Indonesia Premier Division, is the key player.

Homebase
PS Sumbawa Barat was playing their home games in Gelora Turide Stadium, Mataram. After two seasons played in the Mataram (beginning in the 2014 season) the club moved to playing in their hometown in West Sumbawa. This is due to the construction of a new stadium with a capacity of 12,000 spectators in downtown Taliwang; the stadium was named Lalu Magaparang.

Sponsors
PT. Bumi Resources Minerals Tbk. (2011–present)

Kit Suppliers
SPECS (2011–2012)

Rivalries
The club local rival is PS Mataram and Persisum Sumbawa.

References

Football clubs in Indonesia
Football clubs in West Nusa Tenggara
KSB West Sumbawa
Association football clubs established in 2003
2003 establishments in Indonesia